Cape Saint Elias is a cape in the U.S. state of Alaska. It is commonly believed that Mount Saint Elias, the second highest mountain in the United States and Canada, is named for this landform.

The cape was named by Danish explorer Vitus Bering on July 20, 1741, for St. Elias, whose saint's day is July 20. This feature was also called "Santa Rosa" in 1779 by Don Ignacio Artega, "Español" in 1791 by Alessandro Malaspina, and "Punta de Canas," meaning "point of reeds," in 1796, by T.M. Lopez. George Vancouver named it "Hamond Point" in 1794 for Sir Andrew Snape Hamond.

In October 1913, Congress allocated $115,000 to construct a lighthouse on the cape. Construction occurred from 1915 through 1916 and a third order Fresnel Lens was put in place. At the time, this was the second such facility in Alaska.

The cape is also the site of Alaska's first confirmed tornado, which caused minor damage to the area on November 4, 1959. It was the 50th and last state to confirm their first tornado since 1950.

References

United States Department of Agriculture: Forest Service: Cape Saint Elias Lighthouse 

Saint Elias
Landforms of Chugach Census Area, Alaska